Ovingham is an inner northern suburb of Adelaide, South Australia. It is located in the cities of Charles Sturt and Prospect.

Geography
The suburb is located between Park Terrace and the Gawler railway line. It is bisected by Torrens Road.

History
Ovingham was established in 1875 by William Whinham. The portion of Ovingham in the City of Charles Sturt (the triangle bounded by the railway line, Torrens Road and Park Terrace) was previously considered to be part of Bowden, known as Bowden-on-the-Hill. A proposal to rename it to Hillside in 1929 was favorably received locally, but rejected by the government.

Ovingham Post Office opened on 1 November 1879 but was renamed Bowden in 1970.

Demographics

The 2016 census counted 683 people in Ovingham. Slightly over half of them were male (50.1%) and two thirds were born in Australia.

Government

Local government
Part of Ovingham lies in Hindmarsh Ward in the City of Charles Sturt local government area, being represented in that council by Paul Alexandrides and Craig Auricht. The remainder of the suburb lies in the City of Prospect.

State and federal
Ovingham lies in the state electoral district of Adelaide and the federal electoral division of Adelaide.

Community
The Bombay Bicycle Club, a themed hotel, is located on Torrens Road.
The Ovingham Football Club, the local team, is located on Churchill Road.

Transportation

Roads
Ovingham is serviced by Torrens Road, connecting the suburb to Adelaide city centre, and Park Terrace, which forms its south-eastern boundary. Churchill Road heads north out of the suburb.

Public transport
Ovingham is serviced by public transport run by the Adelaide Metro.

Trains
The Gawler railway line passes beside the suburb. The closest station is Ovingham. Over the last few months, the government has been building an overpass over the railway line; the overpass removes the need for the level crossing which has been there for decades.

Buses
The suburb is serviced by buses run by the Adelaide Metro.

See also

 List of Adelaide suburbs

References

External links

Suburbs of Adelaide
Populated places established in 1875